Yakshinskaya is a rural locality (a village) in Gorodetskoye Rural Settlement, Kichmengsko-Gorodetsky District, Vologda Oblast, Russia. The population was 62 as of 2002. There are 2 streets.

Geography 
Yakshinskaya is located 39 km northwest of Kichmengsky Gorodok (the district's administrative centre) by road. Privolnaya is the nearest rural locality.

References 

Rural localities in Kichmengsko-Gorodetsky District